The Molten Division III Men's Invitational Volleyball Championship Tournament was a championship event for NCAA Division III men's volleyball, founded in 1997 and operating through 2011. While the NCAA has sponsored an annual national championship for men's volleyball since 1970 (NCAA Men's National Collegiate Volleyball Championship), programs from all three divisions competed for just four berths in the yearly tournament. Through 2011, no Division III program had earned a berth or been selected to participate in the NCAA National Collegiate Men's Volleyball Championship. Molten is the official volleyball of the NCAA championships.

The Molten Championship was discontinued after its 2011 edition when the NCAA announced it would start an official Division III championship in 2012.

Tournament results

Tournament Final Match Appearances 

7 appearances: Juniata (1998, 2003, 2004, 2005, 2006, 2007, 2009)
6 appearances: Springfield (1997, 2001, 2002, 2003, 2008, 2010)
3 appearances: La Verne (1998, 1999, 2002)
2 appearances: 
 Carthage (2005, 2007)
 D'Youville (1999, 2001); 
 UC Santa Cruz (2006, 2010)
1 appearance:
 Nazareth (2011)
 New Jersey Tech (1997)
 NYU (2000)
 Stevens (2009)
 UC San Diego (2000)
 Vassar (2008)
 Medaille (2004)

Tournament Titles
6 titles:
 Juniata (1998, 2004, 2005, 2006, 2007, 2009)
  Springfield (1997, 2001, 2002, 2003, 2008, 2010)
1 title:
 Nazareth (2011)
 La Verne (1999)
 UC San Diego (2000)

Tournament Appearances
10 appearances: Juniata (1997, 1998, 1999, 2003, 2004, 2005, 2006, 2007, 2008, 2009)
8 appearances: Springfield (1997, 1998, 2001, 2002, 2003, 2007, 2008, 2010)
6 appearances: Stevens (2000, 2003, 2005, 2006, 2007, 2009)
5 appearances: UC Santa Cruz (2004, 2006, 2008, 2009, 2010)
4 appearances:

La Verne (1998, 1999, 2002, 2003)

Carthage (2005, 2007, 2010, 2011)

3 appearances:

D'Youville (1999, 2000, 2001)

2 appearances:

Clarke (1999, 2001)

Eastern Mennonite (1998, 2004)

Medaille (2004, 2005)

Nazareth (2010, 2011)

NYU (2000, 2002)

UC San Diego (1997, 2000)

Vassar (2001, 2008)
 
1 appearance:

Lehman (2002)

New Jersey Tech (1997)

Ramapo (2009)

Rivier (2006)

Championship Committee

In its final season, the Molten Division III Men’s Invitational Volleyball Championship committee consisted of:

Kathy DeBoer (AVCA executive director) 
Doug Beal (USA Volleyball chief executive officer)  
Ivan Marquez (EIVA Commissioner/EIVA representative) 
Bob Newcomb (UC Irvine/at-large representative) 
John Speraw (UC Irvine/AVCA board of directors men’s representative) 
Jerry Matacotta (NECVA) 
Stuart Robinson (SUNY New Paltz athletics director/NECVA) 
Dan Harris (Milwaukee School of Engineering athletics director/Midwest-West representative).

See also
NCAA Men's National Collegiate Volleyball Championship
NCAA Men's Division III Volleyball Championship, the replacement for the Molten Championship
NECVA Championship Tournament

Notes

External links
Molten Volleyballs

Volleyball competitions in the United States
College sports championships in the United States
Recurring sporting events established in 1997
Recurring events disestablished in 2011